The 1982 United States Senate election in New York was held on November 2, 1982. Incumbent Democratic U.S. Senator Daniel Patrick Moynihan won re-election to a second term.

Moynihan's victory made him the first Senator holding this seat to win a second term since Irving M. Ives won his second and final term in 1952.

Democratic primary

Candidates 
Marvin Klenetsky
Daniel Patrick Moynihan, incumbent U.S. Senator since 1977

Results

Republican primary

Candidates 
Whitney North Seymour Jr., former United States Attorney for the Southern District of New York and State Senator from Manhattan
Muriel Siebert, stockbroker
Florence M. Sullivan, Assemblywoman from Bay Ridge, Brooklyn

Results

Results

See also 
 1982 United States Senate elections

References 

New York
1982
1982 New York (state) elections